Yu-Gi-Oh! Arc-V is the fifth spin-off anime in the Yu-Gi-Oh! franchise, produced by Nihon Ad Systems and broadcast by TV Tokyo. It is directed by Katsumi Ono and produced by Studio Gallop. Its plot focuses on Yuya Sakaki. Yuya is a boy seeking to become the greatest entertainer in Action Duels who brings forth a new summoning method to Duel Monsters known as Pendulum Summoning. This season covers Yuya and his friends battling in the Synchro Dimension. 

Four themes songs are used for this season: two openings and two endings. For the English dub version, the opening theme is "Can You Feel the Power".

The English dub premiered episodes in Canada and Australia on Teletoon and 9Go! respectively. In the United States, Nicktoons skipped the season entirely.


Episode list

Notes

References

Arc-V (season 2)
2015 Japanese television seasons
2016 Japanese television seasons